Babino is a rural locality (a village) in Posyolok Anopino, Gus-Khrustalny District, Vladimir Oblast, Russia. The population was 31 as of 2010. There is 1 street.

Geography 
Babino is located 11 km northeast of Gus-Khrustalny (the district's administrative centre) by road. Vashutino is the nearest rural locality.

References 

Rural localities in Gus-Khrustalny District
Sudogodsky Uyezd